ZetTrans is the statutory regional transport partnership for the Shetland Islands. It was created by Transport Scotland under the Transport (Scotland) Act 2005, along with six similar groups covering other areas of Scotland.

Functions 
ZetTrans develops regional transport policy for the Shetland Isles, maintaining infrastructure and providing provision of bus, ferry and air services, as well as supporting sustainable transport.

It is governed by a joint board, whose membership includes representatives of Shetland Islands Council, NHS Shetland and Highlands and Islands Enterprise.

Operations 
ZetTrans specifies and subsidises local bus, ferry, and plane services,  although the routes themselves are operated by private companies or Shetland Islands Council.

The partnership also operates a car sharing scheme, and an online travel planner.

References

Transport in Scotland
Regional Transport Partnerships in Scotland